Supermercado De Candido nice is a chain of supermarkets, located in the Paraguaná Peninsula of Venezuela.

The supermarket company was established in 1950, when the Italian Prati Caruso brothers established it as Supermercado La Franco Italiana. 

During the company's first few years, growth was slow, but when petroleum companies Royal Dutch/Shell and Creole Petroleum Corporation merged the Paraguaná Peninsula experienced significant economic and population growth, inspiring La Franco Italiana to expand. In 1974 the company's name changed officially from La Franco Italiana to Supermercado La Franco Italiana S.A..

In 1989 the company inaugurated what was, as of 2003, the largest supermarket store in Venezuela.

Many people in the Paraguaná Peninsula still refer to the company as La Franco.

The supermarket got sold due to economic and security problems. It got sold to the company "De Candido" which has several supermarkets in the country. It is now called "De Candido".

Supermarkets of Venezuela
Retail companies established in 1950
1950 establishments in Venezuela